Micropolis is a sector of the area of Planoise, in the city of Besançon, Doubs, Franche-Comté, France.

History 
Before the construction of the halls, the Roy farm was located in this site. This building was a farm, then a chretien church, and was integrate in the new concert building in 1988. A lot of greats events of the city takes place in Micropolis : the "foire comtoise", the big amusement park of the region, Micronora the biggest European microtechnology salon and the concerts of the city. In 2007, the French president Nicolas Sarkozy choose Micropolis for do his electoral meeting.

See also 
 Funfair of Besançon
 Planoise
 Besançon

References 

Planoise
Areas of Besançon